Farmanfarmaian is a surname. Notable people with the surname include:

Abdol-Ali Mirza Farmanfarmaian (1932–1973), Qajar prince
Abdol-Aziz Mirza Farmanfarmaian (1920–2013), Iranian architect
Monir Shahroudy Farmanfarmaian (1922–2019), Iranian artist
Sattareh Farmanfarmaian (1921–2012), Qajar princess